Puka Punchu (Quechua puka red, punchu poncho, "red poncho" or  Hispanicized spelling Puca Puncho) is a mountain in the Andes of Peru, about  high. It is located in the Cusco Region, Espinar Province, Condoroma District. Puka Punchu lies southwest of Yuraq Q'asa and north of Chuqi Pirwa.

References

Mountains of Peru
Mountains of Cusco Region